Mikhail Antonovich Rostovtsev (22 October 1872, Taganrog – 19 April 1948, Moscow) was a Russian and Soviet bass, opera and operetta singer, stage actor and film actor. He was made an Honored Artist of the Republic (1927) and an Honored Artist of the RSFSR (1936).

Life
He was the eighteenth child of a Jewish watchmaker and from 1881 onwards lived and went to school in Rostov-on-Don. He sang in the Lyubetskii (Rostov-on-Don) synagogue choir for nine years and from 1884 onwards was an opera dancer.

He joined various popular music ensembles from 1888 onwards before taking the stage name Protsenko. From 1890 to 1894 he performed in the Ukrainian troupes led by Derkach and Kropyvnytskyi.  He later appeared in Kharkov, from 1897 in Moscow and from 1900 in Saint Petersburg. He also set up his own troupe, which toured the Russian Empire. He made his operetta debut in 1901 with the stage name Rostovtsev. Up until 1919 he appeared in major operetta ensembles in Vladivostok, Moscow and Saint Petersburg as well as singing in cabarets

From 1923 onwards he performed at the Maly Petrograd State Academic Theatre ( MALEGOT ) and GATOB, where he was a master in musical comedy and improvisation. He also appeared in several films such as His Excellency (1928), Lieutenant Kijé (1934), Late for a Date (1936) (all produced by Belgoskino), In the Name of Life (1947) and Cinderella (1947) and served with hospital and fighting units during World War II.

In a theater in Moscow Mikhail (Alexander) Rostovtsev played the lead role in the play titled "Jesus in fur".  His role had him reading two verses of Jesus from the Sermon on the Mount in the book of Matthew from the New Testament of the Bible.  Despite the prompter telling him to stop Mikhail (Alexander) Rostovtsev read the whole sermon then stopped.  Making the sign of the cross in the Orthodox manner, and said "Lord, remember me when thou comest into thy Kingdom." (Luke 23:42), and left the stage.  The Communist disposed of him.

References

External links
Akademic (Russian language site) biography of Rostovtsev
Filmhub Biography

1872 births
1948 deaths
Russian basses
20th-century Russian male opera singers
Soviet male opera singers
Russian male stage actors
Soviet male stage actors
Soviet male film actors
Operatic basses
20th-century Russian male actors
Russian male film actors
Belarusfilm films
Jewish Russian actors